Many aviation-related events are expected to take place in 2023. The aviation industry continued to recover from the COVID-19 pandemic.

Deadliest crash
Thus far, the deadliest crash has been Yeti Airlines Flight 691, an ATR 72 which crashed on final approach to Pokhara, Nepal, on 15 January, killing all 72 people on board.

Events
 The VoltAero Cassio 330 is expected to make its first test flight in 2023.
 The Lockheed Martin X-59 QueSST is expected to make its first test flight in 2023 as part of NASA's low-boom supersonic flight demonstrator project.
 The Comac C919 developed by Chinese aircraft manufacturer Comac is expected to enter service with China Eastern Airlines.
 The first prototype of the Turkish fighter aircraft TAI TF-X is expected to make its maiden flight in 2023.
 Ghana Airlines, the new national carrier of Ghana, is expected to begin operations.
 American low-cost airline Northern Pacific Airways is expected to begin operations.
 Marabu airline is expected to begin operations.

January 
 1 January
 The Philippine airspace temporarily closed due to an issue with air traffic control and navigation systems.
 2 January
 Two helicopters collide near the Sea World theme park in the city of Gold Coast, Queensland, Australia. The collision killed four people and injured eight.
 11 January
 Thousands of flights are delayed or cancelled in the United States after a Federal Aviation Administration (FAA) NOTAM system outage.
 15 January
 An ATR 72-500 operating Yeti Airlines Flight 691 from Kathmandu to Pokhara, Nepal, crashes near Pokhara; all 72 people on board are dead.
 18 January
 A helicopter crashes in Brovary, a suburb of Kyiv, Ukraine, killing Minister of Internal Affairs of Ukraine Denys Monastyrsky, his deputy Yevhen Yenin, and state secretary Yurii Lubkovych and 11 others.
 28 January
 Flybe, a British regional airline which relaunched in April 2022, ceases operations and enters administration.
 31 January
 The 1,574th and final Boeing 747, a 747-8 freighter, is delivered to Atlas Air.
 Norwegian carrier Flyr, which launched operations in June 2021, ceases operations before filing for bankruptcy after failing to secure financing.
 Australian low-cost airline Bonza conducts its maiden flight from the Sunshine Coast to the Whitsundays.

February 
 4 February
 A Chinese-operated high-altitude weather balloon was shot down by the US Air Force over US territorial waters off the coast of South Carolina. Over the next few days, more balloons are shot down over the US and Canada.
 6 February
 Mitsubishi Heavy Industries terminates its SpaceJet project and plans to liquidate its Mitsubishi Aircraft Corporation subsidiary.
 A Boeing 737-300 of Coulson Aviation crashes while fighting fires in Australia; both pilots survive the crash.
 14 February
 In one of the largest ever purchases of passenger aircraft, Air India places orders for a total of 470 airliners: 250 from Airbus (210 A320neo family and 40 A350s) and 220 from Boeing (190 737 MAX, 20 787s and 10 777Xs).

March
 2 March 
 Virgin Atlantic joins the SkyTeam alliance.

June 

 The Paris Air Show is scheduled to be held.

November 

 The Dubai Airshow is scheduled to be held.

References

 
2023-related lists
Aviation by year
Technology timelines by year
Transport timelines by year